Zeltnera trichantha is a flowering plant species in the family Gentianaceae with the common name alkali centaury. It is endemic to northern California.

Description
Zeltnera trichantha plants are up to 45 cm tall with ovate to lanceolate leaves up to 4 cm long. The inflorescence is flat topped and densely packed with small but showy pink flowers with five petals and a yellow to white throat.

Range and habitat
Zeltnera trichantha is native to northern California, mostly in coastal hills and mountains and occasionally in the foothills of the Sierra Nevada. It often grows in alkaline vernal pools and saline flats, sometimes on serpentine soils.

References

trichantha